Meixedo may refer to the following places in Portugal:

Meixedo (Bragança), a former parish in Bragança
Meixedo e Padornelos, a parish in Montalegre 
Meixedo (Viana do Castelo), a parish in Viana do Castelo